As of March 2017, the share of Kazakhstan's urban population is 53%. Kazakhstan's modernization program and innovative development path are expected to accelerate the country's urbanization processes resulting in increased share of urban population from 53% to 70% by 2030.

The following is a list of cities with more than 50,000 inhabitants in Kazakhstan. The names of many places have been changed during the last century, sometimes more than once. Wherever possible, the old names have been included and linked to the new ones.

Gallery

References

External links
 

 
Cities
Kazakhstan, List of cities in